The Baltic nation of Latvia is home to several protected areas, which receive protection because of their environmental, cultural or similar value.

In addition  of marine area protected, or 16.04% of the country’s territorial waters. Total number of protected areas — 1118. In Latvia there are 4  Strict Nature Reserves, 4  National Parks, 261  Managed Nature Reserves, 325 Natural Monuments, 6 Ramsar sites and 9  Protected Landscape.

Managed Reserves
In Latvia there are 294 Managed Nature Reserves.

National parks

Ramsar sites 
In Latvia there are 6 Ramsar Sites.
 Lake Engure,
 Lake Kaņieris ,
 Lubana wetland complex ,
 Northern Bogs,
 Pape Wetland Complex,
 Teiči and Pelecare bogs.

Protected Landscapes
In Latvia there are 9  Protected Landscapes. 
 Ādaži
 Augšdaugava
 Augšzeme
 Kaučers
 Nīcgales Meži
 Veclaicene
 Vecpiebalga
 Vestiena
 Ziemeļgauja

See also 
 List of national parks of Latvia
 Environmental issues in Latvia

References

Nature reserves
Latvia
Protected areas of Latvia
Protected areas